Michael Duvert is an American actor who plays Dax Ryston on the MyNetworkTV limited-run serial Saints & Sinners. He previously appeared on the daytime drama One Life to Live and on All My Children in 1994. Duvert also appeared in Brother to Brother (2004).

Filmography

Film

Television

External links

Living people
American male television actors
Year of birth missing (living people)
American male soap opera actors
20th-century American male actors